Below is a List of Os Caras de Pau episodes.

Season 1: 2010

Season 2: 2011

References

Os Caras de Pau